Stenoplastis flavinigra is a moth of the family Notodontidae. It is found from Choco in north-western Colombia south to Pichincha in Ecuador. It occurs at low to mid elevations between 100 and 1,000 meters.

It is the smallest species in the genus Stenoplastis.

References

Moths described in 1910
Notodontidae of South America